Sanghar District is one of the largest districts of Sindh province, Pakistan. This district lies between 25058'13 N latitudes and 69024'4E longitudes. It was a village before Mallah Tribe were settled there. This district has the largest Mallah tribe population. It has an area of 9874 square kilometres. It is located in the centre of Sindh and is bounded to the east by India. Its primary industry is agriculture.

Largest tribe of Sanghar district is Mallah who has the population of almost 350000 people. Other tribes are : Jat , Hingora, Wassan, Mallah, Mirani, Mirbahar, Dhareja, Unar, Siyal, Nizamani, Chandio, Rind, Leghari, Arain, Muhajir, Nareja.

The following cities are located in Sanghar District: Sanghar, Tando Adam, Jam Nawaz Ali, Shahdadpur, Shahpur Chakar, Sinjhoro, Jhol, and Sarhari among others.

Sanghar District is also known as the district of Hur Mujhaids, who are followers of Muslim saint Syed Shah Mardan Shah-II. They also fought against British government under the command of Sibghatullah Shah Rashidi.

Administrative subdivisions
The district of Sanghar is administratively subdivided into 6 tehsils:

 Jam Nawaz Ali Tehsil
 Khipro Tehsil
 Sanghar Tehsil
 Shahdadpur Tehsil
 Sinjhoro Tehsil
 Tando Adam Khan Tehsil

District Council Sanghar has 70 Union councils , 4 Municipal Committees and 11 Town Committees.

History

The town of Sanghar, the district headquarters, was formerly a small village that has been populated since the 18th century. It was named after a pious fisher-woman, Mai Singhar; for more than a century, it remained a small village with a population of few hundreds.

After the 1853 invasion by Charles Napier, Sindh was divided into provinces and was assigned zamindars, also known as "Wadera", to collect taxes for the British. Sindh was later made part of British India's Bombay Presidency, and became a separate province in 1935. During this period Sanghar obtained the status of Taluka, an administrative subdivision, and was alternatively included in districts of Nawabshah and Tharparkar. In 1954 it was given the status of District-Headquarters.

The people of the district, specifically the Hurs, played a vital role in independence of Pakistan. The Hurs were an organised military rebel group led by Pir Syed Sabghatullah Shah Pagaro Shaheed, popularly known as Pir Pagara, that sought independence from the British Raj. They fought a guerrilla warfare campaign against the British military, and were always a thorn in the side of British Raj. It has been said that this warfare was one of the major nails in the coffin of British Raj in India.

According to legend, the bodies of Sohni Mahiwal, the titular heroes of one of the four popular tragic romances of Sindh, were recovered from the Indus River near Shahdadpur city and are buried there.

Places 
 Mir Shahdad Jo Qubo, the tomb of Mir Shahdad Talpur, who is regarded as one of the finest military commanders of Sindh, is one of the historical heritages of Sindh and is located in Shahpur Chakar, at a graveyard of the family members of Mir Shahdad Talpur. Shahdadpur, a big city of Sindh Province, is named after Mir Shahdad Talpur, while Shahpur Chakar is named behind his son Mir Chakar Talpur.
 Mansura, ruins from the seventh century A.D. This site has been excavated by the government of Pakistan, and where the local folks go Gold-jewelry hunting after heavy rains. The rains wash off the top soil thereby exposing, among other artifacts, the ancient jewelry.

Demographics 
At the time of the 2017 census, Sanghar district had a population of 2,049,873, of which 1,059,051 were males and 990,578 females. The rural population was 1,478,154 (72.11%) and urban 571,719 (27.89%). The literacy rate is 41.40%: 52.72% for males and 29.32% for females.

The majority religion is Islam, with 77.80% of the population. Hinduism (including those from Scheduled Castes) is 21.79% of the population.

At the time of the 2017 census, 77.92% of the population spoke Sindhi, 8.95% Urdu, 6.25% Punjabi, 1.43% Balochi, 1.22% Saraiki and 1.19% Brahui as their first language.

Tando Adam is the most populous city of the district.

The total area of the district is 10,728 km2. The population of other major cities and towns is presented in the following Table.

List of 
The following is a list of Sanghar District's , organised by taluka:

 Sanghar Taluka (69 )
 Ait Par
 Akanwari
 Awadh
 Bachna
 Bahram Bari
 Bakhoro
 Bao Khan
 Baqar
 Bassi
 Bobi
 Chah Kabir
 Chamaro
 Chotiaryon
 Dabhri
 Dareri
 Darero
 Daro Bazaar
 Dhilyar
 Dhoro Janib
 Dighal
 Dilshad Dario
 Dim
 Dodan Ja Kanda
 Dubi
 Gharo
 Hamzi Ji Khad
 Harathri
 Jakhro
 Jhun
 Kalar
 Kandiari
 Kehor
 Khadwri
 Khakharo
 Kundho
 Lib
 Loharro
 Lutko
 Makhi
 Mano Khan Chandio
 Mihroo
 Mohammad Ali Wah
 Photo Dhoro
 Pir Kehor
 Rachar
 Raj Wah
 Rar
 Rip
 Rohero
 Sadhano
 Sadrat
 Sahar Pir
 Samathri
 Samoor
 Sanghar
 Sanharo
 Santore
 Sareji
 Sethar Pir
 Sim Janido
 Sinhori
 Siran Wari
 Tando Mitha Khan
 Thar Sareji
 Thar Siran Wari
 Togacho
 Toori
 Waghyoon
 Yaro Hingoro
 Jam Nawaz Ali Taluka (51 )
 Berani
 Darhan
 Mari
 22 Dim
 23 Dim
 24 Dim
 25 Dim
 26 Dim
 42 Jamrao
 43 Jamrao
 44 Jamrao
 45 Jamrao
 46 Jamrao
 47 Jamrao
 48 Jamrao
 49 Jamrao
 50 Jamrao
 51 Jamrao
 52 Jamrao
 53 Jamrao
 54 Jamrao
 55 Jamrao
 56 Jamrao
 57 Jamrao
 58 Jamrao
 59 Jamrao
 60 Jamrao
 61 Jamrao
 62 Jamrao
 63 Jamrao
 64 Jamrao
 65 Jamrao
 66 Jamrao
 67 Jamrao
 68 Jamrao
 69 Jamrao
 70 Jamrao
 82 Jamrao
 83 Jamrao
 84 Jamrao
 84-A Jamrao
 85 Jamrao
 86 Jamrao
 Bhadar
 Bhiro
 Hasan Ali
 Hot Wassan
 Jam Jani
 Jampur
 Mashaikh Odho
 Raj Pari
 Khipro Taluka (78 )
 Amli
 Bakherji
 Bantheri
 Bawarli
 Bawarlo
 Bhatyani
 Bhit Bhaiti
 Bhopi
 Boreji
 Chanesari
 Chounro
 Dakhna
 Dar
 Dhadh Liari
 Dhadhro
 Dhilyar A. Hadi
 Dhilyar Rukan
 Ding
 Dugo
 Ellachi
 Ghandelan
 Girhar
 Gorilo
 Halaro
 Hathungo
 Jiao
 Juman
 Kadh
 Kadh Kandiari
 Kamaro
 Manchhari
 Kangani
 Kaniro
 Kathoro
 Keti
 Khahi
 Khajni
 Khambharo
 Khani Rajar
 Kheerhadi
 Khipro
 Khori
 Khorilo
 Khorlio
 Kirayari
 Koorthari
 Kunri
 Lakhisar
 Loon Khan
 Manhoori
 Marvi
 Mathoon
 Moorhadi
 Moorkadh
 Nehar
 Nian
 Ona Thada
 Pabban
 Paneri
 Pehalwano
 Pharanhadi
 Rahundro
 Ranahu
 Ranak Dehar
 Rar
 Rebhan
 Roonjho
 Samarjo
 Samnhar
 Sandh
 Senhoji
 Sigh
 Singhar
 Tarachho
 Tharahadi
 Wadhal
 Waniyani
 Warhiyan
 Sinjhoro Taluka (94 )
 Sinjhoro
 01 Dim
 02 Dim
 3 Dim
 4 Dim
 5 Dim
 6 A Dim
 6 B Dim
 07 Dim
 8 Dim
 9 Dim
 10 Dim
 11 Dim
 12 Dim
 13 Dim
 14 Dim
 15 Dim
 16 Dim
 17 Dim
 18 Dim
 19 Dim
 20 Dim
 21 Dim
 22 Hingora
 1 Jamrao
 2 Jamrao
 3 Jamrao
 4 Jamrao
 5 Jamrao
 6 Jamrao
 7 Jamrao
 8 Jamrao
 9 Jamrao
 10 Jamrao
 11 Jamrao
 12 Jamrao
 13 A Jamrao
 13 Jamrao
 14 Jamrao
 15 Jamrao
 16 Jamrao
 17 Jamrao
 18 Jamrao
 19 Jamrao
 20 Jamrao
 21 Jamrao
 22 A Jamrao
 22 Jamrao
 23 Jamrao
 24 Jamrao
 25 Jamrao
 26 Jamrao
 27 Jamrao
 28 Jamrao
 29 Jamrao
 30 Jamrao
 31 Jamrao
 32 Jamrao
 33 Jamrao
 34 Jamrao
 35 Jamrao
 36 Jamrao
 37 Jamrao
 38 Jamrao
 39 Jamrao
 40 A Jamrao
 40 Jamrao
 41 Jamrao
 Bitoor
 Bothro
 Dham Rakhi
 Doofan
 Duthro
 Gujherao
 Jarari
 Jhol
 Kari Charo
 Kehro Rayati
 Kharho Jagir
 Kharo Jagir
 Kot Bijar
 Kunro
 Kunro
 Lakha
 Liari Jagir
 Liari Rayati
 Mathelo
 Muthalo Jagir
 Sarki Kandi
 Shafi Mohammad
 Thahim
 Ubhpur Jagir
 Ubhpur Rayati
 Tando Adam Taluka (28 )
 Ahdi Junejo
 Banbhna
 Belharo
 Bhit Dhano
 Bhobhar
 Burlra
 Dadi
 Darar
 Dhamoi
 Dukand
 Durmah
 Gujhro
 Guller
 Hurbari
 Junejani
 Kangpati
 Kumb Daroon
 Lohano
 Mangino
 Manik Thahim
 Marani
 Pai
 Qurlaqqdeer
 Sanghar
 Sulkandar
 Sutiari
 Tando Adam
 Wadadani
 Shahdadpur Taluka (55 )
 Ahmedabad
 Barachari Jageer
 Barachri Rayati
 Barandi
 Barhoon
 Barhoon Jageer
 Batri
 Bero Zardari
 Bhaji
 Bherwari
 Chamro
 Chhimbh
 Dabhro
 Deh Dhabro Jageer
 Gango
 Gul Mohammad Laghari
 Haji Age Dino
 Hamzo Bagrani
 Jama Jageer
 Jamma Rayati
 Kandi
 Karamullah Dahri Rayati
 Karamullah Jageer
 Kullan
 Liski
 Lundo
 Maldasi
 Maldasi Jageer
 Mano Jamali
 Maqsoodo Rind
 Mian Ji Masjid
 Mian-jin-masjid Jageer
 Mira Chhan
 Mojwa
 Mova Chhora
 Murad Ali Rind
 Paboro
 Pano Laghari
 Qubba Shahdad
 Quboyagan
 Ranjho Bagrani
 Runo
 Saeed Khan
 Sahitta
 Sarhari
 Sarohri
 Shahdadpur
 Shahpur Chakar
 Shehli Nizamani
 Shuja Jakhro
 Sumair
 Topan Dahri
 Wazir Rind
 Wazir Rind Jageer
 Yaro Dahri

See also
 Mansura, Sindh
 Cadet College Sanghar
 Jheol
 Sohni Mahiwal Tomb of Sohni in Shahdadpur.
 Sanghar City
Khadro Town.

References

Bibliography

External links
 District Government Sanghar

 
Districts of Sindh